Theodore Angelos was co-ruler of Thessaly from  to his death in .

Theodore was the third son of John I Doukas, ruler of Thessaly by his wife, who is only known by her monastic name Hypomone ("Patience"). When John died in or shortly before 1289, he was succeeded by Theodore's older brother Constantine, but Theodore served as his co-ruler. Initially, the two brothers were under the tutelage of Anna Palaiologina Kantakouzene as they were underage.

References

Sources
 
 
 
 

13th-century births
1299 deaths
People from Thessaly
Medieval rulers of Thessaly
13th-century Byzantine people
Theodore
Sebastokrators
13th-century rulers in Europe
Ypati